Frank Nolan (27 June 1920 – 12 October 2009) was an Australian cricketer. He played in three first-class matches for Queensland between 1948 and 1950.

See also
 List of Queensland first-class cricketers

References

External links
 

1920 births
2009 deaths
Australian cricketers
Queensland cricketers
Cricketers from Brisbane